Aaron Koblin (born January 14, 1982) is an American digital media artist and entrepreneur best known for his innovative use of data visualization and his pioneering work in crowdsourcing, virtual reality, and interactive film. He is co-founder and president of virtual reality company Within (formerly Vrse), founded with Chris Milk. Formerly he created and lead the Data Arts Team at Google in San Francisco, California from 2008 to 2015.

Biography 
Koblin received his BA from UC Santa Cruz and is a graduate of UCLA's Design | Media Arts MFA program, and sits on the board of the non-profit Gray Area Foundation For The Arts GAFFTA in San Francisco. He was the Abramowitz Artist in Residence at MIT in 2010 and the Annenberg Innovator in residence at USC in 2013.

Koblin's artworks are part of the permanent collections of the Victoria and Albert Museum (V&A), the Museum of Modern Art (MoMA), and the Centre Georges Pompidou. He has presented at TED, and The World Economic Forum, and his work has been shown at international festivals including Ars Electronica, SIGGRAPH, and the Japan Media Arts Festival. In 2006, his Flight Patterns project received the National Science Foundation's first place award for science visualization. In 2009, he was named to Creativity Magazine's Creativity 50, in 2010 he was one of Esquire Magazine's Best and Brightest and Fast Company's Most Creative People in Business, and in 2011 was one of Forbes magazine's 30 under 30. Koblin was an Eyebeam exhibiting artist.

In 2014, Koblin was awarded the National Design Award for Interactive Design.

Works 

 The Johnny Cash Project, a music video for Johnny Cash
 This Exquisite Forest, displayed 2012–2013 at Tate Modern
 Radiohead's House of Cards music video with James Frost
 The Wilderness Downtown, for Arcade Fire's We Used to Wait
 Three Dreams of Black, for "Black" on Danger Mouse and Daniele Luppi's album Rome

References

External links
  - recorded March 2011
 Work of Aaron Koblin
 Creators Project Video Profile on Aaron Koblin
 

1982 births
American graphic designers
People from Santa Monica, California
Living people
Information visualization experts
UCLA School of the Arts and Architecture alumni